PSI is the sixth studio album by the industrial rock band Pitchshifter, released in 2002.  Their previous two albums had been released on a major label, but this was released by the minor Mayan Records, a subsidiary label owned by Sanctuary Records.
"Eight Days" and "Shutdown" were released as singles.

Track listing

Personnel 
 Pitchshifter
 J.S. Clayden - lead vocals, programming
 Jim Davies - guitars
 Mark Clayden - bass
 Jason Bowld - drums

 Additional musicians
 Johnny Mingus - live double bass on "Stop Talking (So Loud)"
 Greg Marshall - Loony drum break on "Super-Clean"

 Production
 Produced by J.S. Clayden, Jim Davies and Machine
 Additional sound design and synthesizer manipulation by Clinton Bradley 
 Engineered by J.S. Clayden
 Programmed by J.S. Clayden, Dan Rayner and Tim Rayner
 Recorded by J.S. Clayden and Jim Davies 
 Mixed by Machine
 Written by J.S. Clayden and Jim Davies

 Artwork
 Sam Hayles / DOSE-productions.com

References 

Pitchshifter albums
2002 albums
Sanctuary Records albums
Albums produced by Machine (producer)